Montanna Wilson Ioane (born 30 October 1994) is an Australian-born Italian professional rugby union player who primarily plays wing for the Rebels in Super Rugby. He has also represented Italy at international level, having made his test debut against Wales during the Autumn Nations Cup. Ioane has previously played for clubs such as Stade Français, Tasman, Bay of Plenty, and Benetton.

Early life 
Monty Ioane was born to a Samoan father, Paul, and a Fijian mother, Vika, in Melbourne, Victoria. As a young child Monty did not enjoy playing rugby and quit the sport until returning to it at age 12. After receiving a scholarship, Monty moved to Brisbane, Queensland to attend Anglican Church Grammar School at age 16. He stated that the decision to leave his parents in order to attend boarding school was difficult but his uncle Digby Ioane was already based in Brisbane and playing for the Queensland Reds. Monty Ioane played rugby while attending school and advanced to the Queensland Reds Academy.

At age 18, Monty Ioane moved to Paris, France, to play professionally. His uncle Digby had signed with Stade Français and worked out a deal to have his nephew Monty sign to the club with him. In 2015, Digby shifted to playing in Japan while Monty moved to play in New Zealand.

Professional career

Stade Français 
After spending time at the Queensland Reds Academy, Ioane moved to France in November 2013 after signing to Stade Français, and was a part of their U21 squad, the Espoirs. Ioane played for the club in the first-tier French Top 14 competition during the 2014–15 season. He played six game for the club, and has described his time there as "a learning process."

Chiefs and Tasman Mako 
In 2015, Ioane moved to New Zealand after he was recruited by Dave Rennie, head coach of the Chiefs in Super Rugby, to join their developmental squad. He played pre-season games with the squad in 2016, playing against the development squads of the Blues and Hurricanes, and against the Hong Kong national team in April.

He signed to play for the Bay of Plenty Steamers, but was immediately placed on loan to Tasman Mako, playing for them in the second-tier Championship during the 2015 ITM Cup.

Bay of Plenty 
Ioane played for the Bay of Plenty Steamers in the second-tier Championship during the 2016 Mitre 10 Cup. In the 2017 season, Bay of Plenty reached the finals of the Championship but missed out on promotion after losing to Wellington. That year Ioane caught the eye of Antonio Pavanello, the sporting director of Benetton, who was looking to sign a wing for his club.

Benetton 
In November 2017, Ioane signed to Italian side Benetton Rugby, making his return to Europe for the 2017–18 Pro14 season. He extended his contract with Benetton for a further two seasons until 2020.

When the contract expired, he re-signed until 2022, making himself eligible for a call to the Italian national team. According to World Rugby's rules prior to 2018, Ioane was eligible from November 2020 after completing three years of residency in Italy. In July 2020, for the first time, he was invited to take part to the Italian national team camp.
In December 2020, he made the Italy squad again. He played with Benetton Rugby until September 2022.

Statistics

List of international test tries 
As of 13 November 2022

Personal life 
He is the nephew of Digby Ioane, and is the cousin of Pete Samu, both of whom have played for the Australia national rugby union team, and is the cousin of Ole Avei who plays for the Samoa national rugby union team.

Ioane has two daughters with his girlfriend Melisa Dasci. Ioane was born into a Catholic family but has stated he wasn't religious. While in Italy, aged 25, Ioane converted to Islam in June 2020 after meeting and being inspired by Austrian MMA fighter Wilhelm Ott who had converted in April during the COVID-19 lockdown. Ioane described himself as being in his room and "having a low point in [his] life" when he turned to and spoke with his partner Melisa, who was born Muslim, who "started talking about God" leading him to take an interest in studying religion. After Ott messaged him one day, the two met for dinner where he learned of how Ott had changed his life in a positive direction. Ioane later received religious assistance from Benetton teammate Cherif Traore.

He enjoys relaxing by playing the guitar or listening to music, and is an avid reader.

References

External links 

1994 births
Living people
Australian Muslims
Stade Français players
Tasman rugby union players
Bay of Plenty rugby union players
Benetton Rugby players
Rugby union wings
Australian rugby union players
Australian people of Fijian descent
Australian sportspeople of Samoan descent
Italy international rugby union players
Italian rugby union players
Melbourne Rebels players
Rugby union players from Melbourne
Australian expatriate rugby union players
People with acquired Italian citizenship
Australian expatriate sportspeople in France
Expatriate rugby union players in France
Australian expatriate sportspeople in New Zealand
Expatriate rugby union players in New Zealand